Cuyo, officially the Municipality of Cuyo,  is a 4th class municipality in the province of Palawan, Philippines. According to the 2020 census, it has a population of 23,489 people.

Its territory includes the western half of Cuyo Island, as well as Bisucay, Caponayan, Cauayan, Imalaguan, Lubid, Manamoc, Pamalican, Pandan, Round, and Quiminatin islands, all part of the Cuyo Archipelago.

Cuyo is the oldest town in Palawan which has a culture of its own and was preserved for more than 350 years. During the Spanish colonization of the Philippines, Cuyo became the second capital of Palawan after Puerto Princesa from 1873 to 1903.

From the sea, Cuyo Island's first visible landmark is a lighthouse by the pier. Many of the streets leading to the town have already been cemented but the town has preserved the Hispanic plaza-iglesia structures. Dominating the town centre is Cuyo's 1860 church, convent, and fort built by the Spanish and finished in 1680. Nearby stands a schoolhouse, and a monument of national hero Jose Rizal.

The municipality is served by Cuyo Airport in the neighboring municipality of Magsaysay. The town and its cultural and natural environs are being considered to be nominated in the tentative list for UNESCO World Heritage Site declaration in the future.

History

Oriental traders were early discoverers of the Cuyo group of islands and introduced barter trading with the locals.

Later, the Malay chief Matuod and his people arrived in big boats called sakayan and formed settlements on Cuyo. The Islamic chieftain Datu Magbanua later also settled on Cuyo, later consolidating his power so that chieftains from other islands recognized his rule. Other Cuyunon chieftains in nearby islands include Datu Cabaylo of Taytay, Datu Macanas of Busuanga and Datu Cabangon whose domain stretched South of Taytay towards Puerto Princesa. The Malays brought with them their dances, and when blended with native dance, the "Soriano", it became known as the "pondo-pondo" one of the most popular folk dances even up to the present.

During the rule of Datu Magbanua, three Chinese arrived on the island and settled also on Cuyo. The Chinese discovered gold deposits in Mount Aguado and introduced gold mining, smith working, pottery, and other handicrafts. The natives of Cuyo became suspicious of their presence and later expelled them. They sailed to Ilongilong (today known as Iloilo) and formed another settlement called Parián.

In 1622, the Conde de San Agustín, together with five Spanish missionaries, colonised the island they named Cuyo. The friendly character of the people proved to be a blessing to the Spaniards, who found it easy converting the native population to Catholicism. They immediately baptised some 500 inhabitants, however, many still regarded their indigenous Cuyonon religion as sacred and continued to perform Cuyonon rituals. The supreme deity of the Cuyunon people was Diwata ng Kagubatan (literally goddess of the forest), who was honored in a celebrated feast, periodically held atop of Mount Caimamis in Cuyo Island. When most of the natives were converted to Christianity during the Spanish Era, about 2/3 of the converted Cuyunon were still celebrating her feast, angering the Spanish imperialists. The situation led the Spanish authorities to intensify their evangelization and governance efforts, which included the forced Roman Catholic conversion of the Cuyonon people, burning of houses of non-Catholic Cuyonons, and massive slavery. Later, the Spanish called Diwata ng Kagubatan as Virgen Del Monte, in another bid to rebrand the deity as 'Catholic'. Prior to the institution of the Provincia de Calamianes, Cuyo was directly administered as part of the Island of Panay, while Coron islands were administered by the Spanish authorities of Mindoro.

In 1636, a powerful fleet under the Muslim Datu Tagul raided Cuyo and other places in Palawan. In Cuyo, the Muslims attacked the church and clergy house. They set the town on fire and took with them prisoners including a priest, Fr. Francisco de Jesús María. They then sailed to Agutaya and Culion, where they pillaged and attacked defenceless civilians. The raiders abducted another priest from Culion, Fr. Alonzo de San Agustín, as he was saying Mass. A Spanish naval flotilla of six vessels and 250 men under Captain Nicolas Gonzáles met the returning pirates with their loot and booty on December 21, 1636. Datu Tagul was killed, 300 of his men captured, and 120 prisoners were freed. The two captured priests were killed.

In 1957, the following sitios were converted to barrios: Emilod and Balading.

Geography

The Island is under the jurisdiction of the municipalities of Cuyo and Magsaysay. The poblacion of Cuyo is home to a Spanish fort, which shelters a church and a convent in its high stone walls.

Barangays
Cuyo is politically subdivided into 17 barangays. In 1956, sitio Danawan was elevated into a barrio.

Climate

Demographics

Economy

Cuyo Fort
During the early Spanish period, purposely to protect the Cuyonon from sporadic Moro attacks, Fort Cuyo was constructed and finished in 1680. The original complex of stone and mortar was a square with four bastions. It has a tall belfry and watchtowers; its cannons, which face the sea, are now fired only during town celebrations. It is considered as one of the most ancient and unique forts in the Philippines. Unique in the sense that you can find the church, the convent and the Perpetual Adoration chapel all within the fort.

In 1762 one of the British ships that invaded Manila fired at the Cuyo fort but it was not damaged at all. Another fort was started at Lucbuan seven kilometres away on the east side of Cuyo island, but it was never finished. In 1873, the capital of Paragua (present day Palawan) was transferred to Cuyo from Taytay.

Culture
Despite its long history Cuyo has held back the hands of time and preserved its rich cultural heritage preserved since more than 350 years.

The tipano band, a flute and drum marching band that is more similar to a corps of drums or a fife and drum corps, and the de kwerdas (string band), supply background music on important social occasions. They also accompany singers and render dance music like the pinundo-pundo. The tipano is reserved for the ati-ati, sinulog, and komedya.

Both ensembles use available instruments and instrumentalists. The tipano core is basically two drums and four to seven transverse mouth flutes with six finger-holes. One or two tipano "nga maite" (small flutes) and three or four tipano "nga mabael" (larger flutes) are played with a redublante (snare drum), bombo (single tenor or bass drum), and sometimes a pair of platilyo. The de kwerdas has two or three sabel, and occasionally a guitar, a bajo (six-stringed bass), a banjo, and a banduria, with the occasional flutes and percussion (in modern ensembles an electric guitar is also used). In Cuyonon music the "akompanimento" refers to the harmonic accompaniment-principal or "primera" to the first or highest voice, and "segunda" to the second.

The Cuyonon youth celebrate love with song during the post-harvest courting season. The Cancion, a popular serenade, is sung with the strumming of a five - or six-stringed guitar in the distinctive punctual manner. Parting is a familiar concern in Cuyunon love songs. Examples of love songs are "Napopongao Ako", "Ang Gegma", "Ploning", "Daragang Taga Cuyo", "Konsomision", "Ako Maski Bayan", "Tiis Manong Pido", "Nagpamasiar Ako", and "Komosta".

Cuyonon dances have evolved from native and Spanish influences. Among these are the Pastores (the Christmas dance of the sheppherds), the Chotis (from the German schothische), Lanceros de Cuyo (local French guadrille), Birginia (Virginia reel or square dance), Paraguanen (a romantic comic duet), and La Jota Paragua (a Castillan-type jota using bamboo castanets and manton). The island is known for the Mazurka de Cuyo, a social dance with characteristic mazurka steps. Another popular dance is the Pinundo-pundo, a stylish wedding dance marked by sudden pauses, its first two parts, featuring solo dances of the boy and the girl, are followed by the suring, a love play between the couple.

The Cuyonon have developed the art of merging song, dance, and drama. Cuyo's Sayaw is a colorful enactment of a story heightened by the music of a string band. It is presented by five pairs of youth arranged in two lines, fully costumed and made up, and bearing props like flowers, crowns, and even knives. After an introductory dance, the leading couple proceed to relate the tale, sometimes using verse. The topic may be anything, from everyday occurrences to special events like winning the sweepstakes. This story is then interpreted in dance and ended with a finale.

Feast of St. Augustine 

Yearly on August 28, Cuyo Island celebrates San Agustin's feast, currently dubbed as the Purongitan Festival, marked as the main celebration of Cuyo town. 

On the eve of the fiesta, a cultural presentation featuring the traditional performing arts and sometimes a separate show of modern songs and dances may be presented. The feast day is begun with a morning mass (sometimes a High Mass officiated by the bishop) and followed by the Ati-ati, a legacy of the Aklanon. Folk from the nearby islands board barotos (boats) to view the parade which recreates the confrontation of San Agustin and the native "savages". Participants portray the Aeta by darkening their bodies with soot and painting their faces with anyel (indigo). They don foot-high headgear of coconut ginit fiber adorned with chicken feathers, and decorate their costumes with coconut leaves. The men, clad in loin cloths, carry spears, bows and arrows, or bolo. The women, wearing patadyong and beaded necklaces, carry baskets with a tumpline.

The participants form two lines, one of men and the other of women. The director signals the start of the singing by striking his cane on the ground. This is followed by a spontaneous dance characterized by sways, hops, jumps, and the jerking of weapons accompanied by chanting; the director also signals the end of the dance. The village captain and his family may recite a series of verses. The director is then approached by the last to recite, customarily the role belongs to youngest child of the barangay captain's family assigned.

As the floats of San Agustin and other saints enter the church at the end of the procession, the participants kneel, prostrate themselves, or sing while performing skipping steps before the images. The merrymaking intensifies when the alakayo, a dancing clown, chases the ladies, stopping only when coins are thrown to him on the ground. The alakayo collects the coins with his mouth.

Meanwhile, the panapatan performance are staged in front of various houses for a fee. These are mostly excerpts of the komedya and ati-ati known as komedya sa kalye and ati-ati sa bukid, the performers of which use simpler clothing than in the more elaborate full-length performances. Ati-ati sa bukid is sung and danced to celebrate a fruitful harvest. Today it is usually danced by young boys wearing masks or indigo-painted faces.

Another pantomime, innocentes, recreates the descent of the "savages" from the hills to pay tribute to San Agustin. They are wearing coconut fibre masks and red striped shirts. The participants frolic and fence with sticks.

Komedya or moro-moro performances are larger (with some 50 actors) and more refined than the ati-ati. The clash between the Muslims and the Christians is further dramatized by background music; commonly used tunes are the pasadoble, marchas, giyera, and kasal.

The same subject is portrayed by the sinulog. The Christians are identified by their black costumes, kampilan, and elongated shields; the Muslims by their red turbans and waistbands, and round shields. The participants may wear masks or paint their faces. Both groups, usually of six dancers each, sometimes perform to the beating of tin cans. Alternate steps of offense and defense, e.g., advancing and retreating, with corresponding movements of weapons, are followed by circular formations simulating scenes of strategy plotting.

Aguado pilgrimage
Mt. Aguado features life-size Stations of the Cross constructed from the foot to the peak of the mountain. Cuyonon devotees, visitors and tourists make the annual pilgrimage to Mt. Aguado as part of the penitential rites done in Cuyo during the Holy Week particularly on Holy Thursday.

Education 
Elementary Schools

 Antipolo Elementary School
 Balading Elementary School
 Caponayan Elementary School
 Cuyo Central School
 Cuyo Miller School
 Lubid Elementary School
 Manamoc Elementary School
 Maringian Elementary School
 P.A.B.N. Bisucay Elementary School
 P.A.B.N. Funda Elementary School
 Pamitinan Elementary School
 Pawa Elementary School
 Suba Elementary School

Secondary Schools

 Cuyo National High School
 GAMNHS BISUCAY
 Manamoc National High School
 Pawa National High School
 Saint Joseph Academy - Cuyo
 San Carlos National High School
 Suba National High School

Tertiary School

 Palawan State University

See also

 List of islands of the Philippines
 Saint Joseph Academy - Cuyo

References

External links
Cuyo Profile at PhilAtlas.com
[ Philippine Standard Geographic Code]
2000 Philippine Census Information
Local Governance Performance Management System

Municipalities of Palawan